Burnaby—Kingsway was a federal electoral district in British Columbia, Canada, that was represented in the House of Commons of Canada from 1988 to 1997.

This riding was created in 1987 from parts of Burnaby, North Vancouver—Burnaby and Vancouver Kingsway ridings.

It was abolished in 1996 when it was merged into Burnaby—Douglas riding.

For its entire history it was represented by New Democratic Party Member of Parliament (MP) Svend Robinson.

Members of Parliament

Election results

See also 

 List of Canadian federal electoral districts
 Past Canadian electoral districts

External links 
Riding history from the Library of Parliament

Former federal electoral districts of British Columbia